Raúl Caballero Ramírez (born 16 January 2001) is a Spanish footballer who plays as a forward.

Club career
Born in Martos, Jaén, Andalusia, Caballero joined Córdoba CF's youth setup in 2017, from hometown side Real Jaén. He made his debut with the former's reserves on 7 January 2019, coming on as a second-half substitute in a 1–2 Tercera División home loss against Écija Balompié.

In the 2019 summer, Caballero moved to UD Almería and returned to the youth setup. He scored his first senior goal with the B-side on 22 November 2020, netting the third of a 4–0 home routing of Loja CD.

Caballero scored ten times for the B's during the 2020–21 season, and spent the 2021 pre-season with the main squad. He made his professional debut on 29 August, replacing Largie Ramazani late into a 1–2 away loss against SD Amorebieta in the Segunda División.

Personal life
Caballero's older brother Antonio is also a footballer. A midfielder, he made his debut with Martos CD.

Honours
Almería
 Segunda División: 2021–22

References

External links

2001 births
Living people
Sportspeople from the Province of Jaén (Spain)
Spanish footballers
Footballers from Andalusia
Association football forwards
Segunda División players
Segunda División B players
Tercera División players
Córdoba CF B players
UD Almería B players
UD Almería players